Melyridae (common name: soft-winged flower beetles) are a family of beetles of the superfamily Cleroidea.

Description
Most are elongate-oval, soft-bodied beetles 10 mm long or less.  Many are brightly patterned in black and brown, yellow, or red.  Some melyrids (Malachiinae) have peculiar orange structures along the sides of the abdomen, which may be everted and saclike or withdrawn into the body and inconspicuous.  Some melyrids have the two basal antennomeres greatly enlarged.  Most adults and larvae are predaceous, but many are common on flowers.  The most common North American species belong to the genus Collops (Malachiinae); C. quadrimaculatus is reddish, with two bluish black spots on each elytron.

Four New Guinean species of Choresine (the more abundant C. pulchra, the less abundant C. semiopaca and the two infrequent C. rugiceps and C. sp. A, the latter as yet unnamed) have been found to contain batrachotoxins, which may account for the toxicity of some birds such as the blue-capped ifrit and hooded pitohui which eat them. The hypothesis that Phyllobates frogs in South America obtain batrachotoxins from related genera of the Melyridae (Choresine does not occur there) has not been tested due to the difficulty of field-work in Colombia.

Evolutionary history 
The oldest fossil of the family are Sinomelyris and Juraniscus from the late Middle Jurassic (Callovian) Daohugou bed in Inner Mongolia, China. The oldest member of Dasytinae is Protodasytes from the early Late Cretaceous (Cenomanian) aged Charentese amber of France.

Distribution
The family Melyridae contains over 100 genera worldwide, with ~520 species in 48 genera in North America, and 16 genera in Europe; the largest diversity is in tropical rainforests.

Subfamilies
Various authorities have, at times, treated each of the presently-recognized subfamilies as families, and a few tribes have been accorded family status, as well (e.g., "Attalomimidae"). The family Mauroniscidae was removed from Melyridae in 1995, and Rhadalidae in 2019.

 Dasytinae Laporte de Castelnau, 1840
 Malachiinae Fleming, 1821
 Melyrinae Leach, 1815

Selected genera

 Ablechrus Waterhouse, 1877
 Amauronia Westwood, 1839
 Amecocerus Solier 1849
 Anthocomus Erichson, 1840
 Anthodromius Redtenbacher, 1850
 Anthomalachius Tshernyshev, 2009
 Apalochrus Erichson, 1840
 Arthrobrachus Solier, 1849
 Astylus Laporte, 1836
 Asydates Casey, 1895
 Attalus Erichson, 1840
 Attalusinus Leng, 1918
 Axinotarsus Motschulsky, 1854
 Balanophorus MacLeay, 1872
 Byturosomus Motschoulsky, 1859
 Carphuroides Champion, 1923
 Carphurus Erichson, 1840
 Cerallus Jacquelin Du Val, 1859
 Cerapheles Mulsant & Rey, 1867
 Ceratistes Fischer von Waldheim, 1844
 Chaetocoelus Leconte, 1880
 Chalchas Blanchard, 1845
 Charopus Erichson, 1840
 Clanoptilus Motschulsky, 1854
 Collops Erichson, 1840
 Colotes Erichson 1840
 Condylops Redtenbacher, 1849
 Cordylepherus Evers, 1985
 Cradytes Casey, 1895
 Cyrtosus Motschulsky, 1854
 Danacea Laporte, 1838
 Dasytastes Casey, 1895
 Dasytellus Casey, 1895
 Dasytes Casey, 1895
 Dasytidius Schilsky, 1896
 Dicranolaius Champion, 1921
 Divales Laporte de Castelnau, 1836
 Dolichophron Kiesenwetter, 1867
 Dolichosoma Stephens, 1830
 Ebaeus Erichson, 1840
 Enallonyx Wolcott, 1944
 Endeodes LeConte, 1859
 Enicopus Stephens, 1830
 Eschatocrepis Leconte, 1861
 Falsomelyris Pic, 1913
 Hadrocnemus Kraatz, 1895
 Halyles Broun, 1883
 Haplomalachius Evers, 1985
 Hoppingiana Blaisdell, 1924
 Hylodanacaea Pic, 1926
 Hypebaeus Kiesenwetter, 1863
 Intybia Pascoe, 1866
 Laius Guérin-Méneville, 1830
 Leptovectura Casey, 1895
 Listropsis Blaisdell, 1924
 Listrus Motschoulsky, 1859
 Malachius Fabricius, 1775
 Melyris Fabricius, 1775
 Melyrodes Gorham, 1882
 Microlipus Leconte, 1852
 Nepachys Thomson, 1859
 Nodopus Marshall, 1951
 Pagurodactylus Gorham, 1900
 Psilothrix Redtenbacher, 1858
 Scelopristis Mayor, 2004
 Sphinginus Mulsant & Rey, 1867
 Spinapalochrus
 Tanaops Leconte, 1859
 Temnopsophus Horn, 1872
 Trichochrous Motschulsky, 1859
 Trophimus Horn, 1870
 Vecturoides Fall, 1930

Notes

 Fauna Europaea
 Coleoptera.org

 
Polyphaga families
Articles containing video clips